Edmund John Glyn Hooper (July 7, 1818 – October 5, 1889) was a Canadian businessman and political figure. He represented Addington in the 1st Parliament of Ontario and Lennox in the House of Commons of Canada as a Liberal-Conservative member from 1879 to 1882.

He was born in Devonshire, England in 1818 and came to Quebec City with his parents in 1819. He served in the local militia during the Lower Canada Rebellion. In 1843, he moved to Lennox County and established himself as a lumber merchant with his brother Augustus. He built a sawmill in Frontenac County which burned down in 1855. He then set up a store in Camden East; he moved to Napanee in 1863 and opened another store there. In the same year, he was appointed treasurer for the provisional council of the Counties of Lennox and Addington. In 1879, he was forced to resign from his position as treasurer when funds were found to be missing; Hooper declared bankruptcy because he was declared indebted to the county.

He died in Napanee in 1889.

External links
Biography at the Dictionary of Canadian Biography Online
Member's parliamentary history for the Legislative Assembly of Ontario
 

1818 births
1889 deaths
Conservative Party of Canada (1867–1942) MPs
Members of the House of Commons of Canada from Ontario
Progressive Conservative Party of Ontario MPPs
English emigrants to Canada